Soulfire Live! is the first live album released by Little Steven and the Disciples of Soul in 2018. The album was recorded during various live performances on the Soulfire tour in 2017. While the initial April 2018 release of the album was digital-only, deluxe versions of the album were reissued on CD (three CDs) in August 2018 and vinyl (seven LPs) in February 2019, containing additional songs recorded during the tour. A Blu-ray edition was also released, containing video of all of the tracks present on the digital, CD, and vinyl editions.  An "expanded edition" of the album containing four CDs of material was released on January 29, 2021.

Track listing

Digital edition

Note
The CD and vinyl edition omits "Until the Good Is Gone (Intro)".

CD and vinyl bonus tracks

Expanded edition CD and vinyl bonus tracks

Personnel 
Little Steven and the Disciples of Soul
 Steven Van Zandt – vocals, guitar, arranger
 Marc Ribler – guitar, slide guitar, music director
 Rich Mercurio – drums
 Jack Daley – bass
 Andy Burton – B3 organ, accordion, synthesizers
 Lowell "Banana" Levinger – piano, mandolin, esraj
 Eddie Manion – baritone saxophone, horn director
 Stan Harrison – tenor saxophone, alto saxophone, flute, oboe
 Clark Gayton – trombone
 Ravi Best – trumpet
 Ron Tooley – trumpet
 Anthony Almonte – percussion
 JaQuita May – backing vocals
 Sara Devine – backing vocals
 Tania Jones – backing vocals
Additional musicians
 Charley Drayton – drums (on "The Time of Your Life" and "I Don't Want to Go Home")
 Everett Bradley – percussion (on "The Time of Your Life" and "I Don't Want to Go Home")
 Jessica Wagner – backing vocals (on "The Time of Your Life" and "I Don't Want to Go Home")
 Erika Jerry – backing vocals (on "The Time of Your Life" and "I Don't Want to Go Home")
 Yahzarah – backing vocals (on "The Time of Your Life" and "I Don't Want to Go Home")
Guests
 Mike Stoller – introduction (on "Mike Stoller Intro")
 Jerry Miller – vocals, guitar (on "Can't Be So Bad")
 Richie Sambora – vocals, guitar (on "Can I Get a Witness")
 Peter Wolf – vocals (on "Freeze Frame")
 Bruce Springsteen – vocals (on "Tenth Avenue Freeze-Out" and "I Don't Want to Go Home")
 Paul McCartney – vocals, guitar (on "I Saw Her Standing There")
Technical
 Steven Van Zandt – producer
 Geoff Sanoff – assistant producer 
 Richard Sharratt – engineer 
 Bob Clearmountain – mixing 
 Sergio Ruelas Jr. – mixing assistant 
 Bob Ludwig – mastering
 Louis Arzonico – artwork, design

References 

2017 live albums
Steven Van Zandt albums
Albums produced by Steven Van Zandt